Edward the Seventh is a 1975 British historical drama series, made by ATV in 13 episodes.

Based on the biography of King Edward VII by Philip Magnus, it starred Annette  Crosbie as Queen Victoria, Timothy West as the elder Edward VII, with Simon Gipps-Kent and Charles Sturridge as Edward in his youth. Helen Ryan and Deborah Grant featured as the elder and younger Queen Alexandra respectively. It was directed by John Gorrie, who wrote episodes 7–10 with David Butler writing the remainder of the series.

Only the final three episodes dramatised Edward as King (in line with his short, nine-year reign, which did not begin until he was nearly sixty years old). Annette Crosbie, who won a BAFTA for her performance, was given top billing in the series (appearing in ten out of the thirteen episodes).

It was first broadcast on TV between April and July 1975. In the United States it was shown under the title Edward the King, with episode introductions by Canadian-American broadcaster Robert MacNeil. In the UK, it is available as a four-disc DVD set, encoded for Region 0, by Network Video. It is also available for the North American market as an extras-less six-disc set.

Series cast

Royalty 
 Annette Crosbie as Queen Victoria (episodes 1–10)
 Timothy West as Albert Edward, Prince of Wales, later King Edward VII (episodes 5–13)
 Helen Ryan as Princess Alexandra, later Queen Alexandra (episodes 6–13)
 Robert Hardy as Prince Albert (episodes 1–4)
 Felicity Kendal as Princess Vicky, later Empress Frederick of Germany (episodes 2–5, 8, 10 and 11)
 Michael Byrne as Fritz, later Frederick III, German Emperor (episodes 2–5, 8)
 Charles Sturridge as Young Bertie (episodes 2–4)
 Simon Gipps-Kent as Younger Bertie (episode 2)
 Deborah Grant as Young Alexandra (episodes 4–5)
 Christopher Neame as Kaiser Wilhelm II (episodes 8 and 10–13)
 Gwyneth Strong as Minny (episodes 4–5)
 Jane Lapotaire as Empress Marie of Russia (episodes 6–8, 10, 12–13)
 Alison Leggatt as the Duchess of Kent (episodes 1–3)
 Charles Dance as Prince Eddy (episodes 8–9)
 Michael Osborne as Prince George, Duke of York, later King George V (episodes 8–13)
 Ian Gelder as Prince Alfred (episodes 2–6)
 Julian Sherrier as Napoleon III, Emperor of the French (episode 2)
 Chloe Ashcroft as Eugénie, Empress of the French (episode 2)
 Patricia O'Brian as Princess Helena (episode 2)
 Deborah Makepeace as Princess Helena (episodes 3–6)
 Shirley Steedman as Princess Alice (episodes 3–6)
 Judy Loe as Princess Mary of Teck, later Queen Mary (episodes 9–13)
 Cheryl Campbell as Princess Beatrice (episodes 8 and 10)
 Anthony Douse as Christian IX of Denmark (episodes 4, 5 and 12)
 Kathleen Byron as Princess Christian, later Queen Louise of Denmark (episodes 4–6)
 Vanessa Miles as Princess Louise (episode 10)
 Madeleine Cannon as Princess Toria (episode 10)
 Rosalyn Elvin as Princess Maud, Queen Maude of Norway (episode 10)
 Bruce Purchase as Alexander III of Russia (episodes 6–8)
 Michael Billington as Tsar Nicholas II of Russia (episodes 10, 12 and 13)
 Meriel Brooke as Tsarina Alexandra (episodes 10 and 13)
 Paul Greenhalgh as King George I of Greece (episodes 5, 8, 10)
 Geoffrey Wincott as King William I of Prussia (episode 6)
 Mel Churcher as Princess Hélène of Orléans (episode 9)

Prime ministers and politicians 
 Joseph O'Conor as Lord Melbourne (episode 1)
 Michael Barrington as Sir Robert Peel (episode 1)
 John Welsh as the Duke of Wellington (episode 1)
 Arthur Hewlett as the Earl of Aberdeen (episode 2)
 André Morell as Lord Palmerston (episodes 2–5)
 Peter Collingwood as Lord John Russell (episode 4–5)
 Michael Hordern as William Ewart Gladstone (episodes 5–6 and 8–10)
 Bryan Coleman as the Earl of Derby (episode 6)
 John Gielgud as Benjamin Disraeli (episodes 6–7)
 Derek Fowlds as Lord Randolph Churchill (episode 7)
 Richard Vernon as Lord Salisbury (episodes 9–11)
 Edward Hardwicke as Lord Rosebery (episodes 9–10)
 Lyndon Brook as A. J. Balfour (episode 10–12)
 Geoffrey Bayldon as Sir Henry Campbell-Bannerman (episode 12–13)
 Angus MacKay as Lord Lansdowne (episodes 11 and 12)
 Basil Dignam as H. H. Asquith (episode 13)
 Geoffrey Beevers as David Lloyd George (episode 13)
 Christopher Strauli as Winston Churchill (episode 13)

British Army and Royal Navy 
 Harry Andrews as Colonel Bruce (episodes 2–4)
 Gareth Thomas as Admiral Lord Charles Beresford (episodes 7 and 9)
 John Normington as Colonel Hon. Oliver Montagu (episodes 7–9)
 Clive Morton as Lieut. Gen. Owen Williams (episode 9)
 James Berwick as Admiral Sir John Fisher (episodes 12–13)

Edward's mistresses 
 Francesca Annis as Lillie Langtry (episodes 7–8)
 Carolyn Seymour as Lady Brooke (episodes 9–10)
 Sally Home as Agnes Keyser (episodes 10 and 13)
 Moira Redmond as Alice Keppel (episodes 10–13)

Others 
 Edward de Souza as Luis de Soveral, Portuguese ambassador (episodes 11–13)
 Patience Collier as Baroness Lehzen (episode 1)
 Noel Willman as Baron Stockmar (episodes 1–2)
 Peter Carlisle as James Buchanan (episode 3)
 Kathryn Leigh Scott as Harriet Lane (episode 3)
 Guy Slater as Lord Carrington (episodes 3–4, 6–8 and 11–12)
 Martin Skinner as Sipido (episode 10)
 Peter Howell as Francis Knollys (episodes 8–10 and 12–13)
 Brewster Mason as Otto von Bismarck (episode 8) (Mason would later reprise his role as Bismarck in Disraeli)
 Denis Lill as Frederick Ponsonby (episodes 11–13)
 Barbara Laurenson as Charlotte Knollys (episodes 9–13)
 Basil Hoskins as Lord Esher (episodes 11–13)
 William Dysart as John Brown (episodes 6–8)
 Robert Robinson as Ernest Cassel (episodes 10, 12, 13)

Episodes

Soundtrack
 "The Daring Young Man on the Flying Trapeze"
 "Champagne Charlie"
 "The Boy I Love Is Up in the Gallery" (Episode 10)
 "A Wand'ring Minstrel I" (Episode 12)

External links
 

British television miniseries
Television series set in the 1840s
Television series set in the 1850s
Television series set in the 1860s
Television series set in the 1870s
Television series set in the 1880s
Television series set in the 1890s
Television series set in the 1900s
Television series set in the 1910s
1975 British television series debuts
1975 British television series endings
1970s British drama television series
British historical television series
Cultural depictions of Edward VII
Cultural depictions of Benjamin Disraeli
Cultural depictions of Queen Victoria on television
Cultural depictions of Wilhelm II
Cultural depictions of George V
Cultural depictions of Nicholas II of Russia
Cultural depictions of Arthur Wellesley, 1st Duke of Wellington
Cultural depictions of Winston Churchill
Cultural depictions of David Lloyd George
Television series by ITV Studios
English-language television shows
Television shows produced by Associated Television (ATV)
Cultural depictions of Napoleon III
Cultural depictions of Albert, Prince Consort
Television shows shot at ATV Elstree Studios